Almanzora is a city in the province of Almería, Andalusia, Spain.

Almanzora may also refer to:

Places in Almería, Andalusia, Spain
 Almanzora (comarca)
 Almanzora (river)
 Almanzora Valley, in Almería

See also
Mansoura (disambiguation)
Mansouria (disambiguation)